Arenjan (also Romanized as Ārenjan; also known as Ārenjīn and Arinjin) is a village in Golab Rural District, Barzok District, Kashan County, Isfahan Province, Iran. At the 2006 census, its population was 146, in 45 families.

References 

Populated places in Kashan County